Ilona Béres is a Hungarian film and television actress.

Selected filmography
 The Man of Gold (1962)
 Hattyúdal (1963)
 Párbeszéd (1966)
 Nappali sötétség (1966)
 Three Nights of Love (1967)
 Elveszett illúziók (1983)
 Moscow Square (2001)

External links

1942 births
Living people
Hungarian film actresses
Hungarian stage actresses
Hungarian television actresses
Actresses from Budapest